Saint George and the Dragon is a painting by Peter Paul Rubens (c. 1605–07), based upon the motif with the same name.

It was painted in Genoa (Saint George is the patron of this city) while Rubens was in Italy to complete his artistic training on behalf of his mentor at the time, Otto van Veen. Many scholars speculate the work was originally commissioned for the Church of Sant'Ambrogio, which was dedicated to Saint George. If so, the commissioner never received the masterpiece, due to the artist holding on to his work until he died in 1640, where Felipe IV procured the piece. It is now in the Museo del Prado of Madrid.

Iconography
 
In the painting the princess represents the church as a whole, and the lamb she is grasping represents the innocence and purity of the church, and Saint George and his steed symbolize the triumph of good over evil as the Saint George stares the beast down from literally “on high”. To reiterate, Saint George's right foot prominently highlighted above the dragon signifies that the dragon (darkness, devil, evil) is in every way beneath Saint George and the light that envelops him and the princess. In opposition, the dragon's form, which very much resembles a serpent, rather than the typical lizard, or dinosaur-like depiction of dragons, an allegory to the classic tale of Adam and Eve, where in Satan takes the form of a serpent.

Notes

External links

1600s paintings
Paintings by Peter Paul Rubens in the Museo del Prado
Horses in art
Religious paintings
Paintings of dragons
Sheep in art
Saint George and the Dragon